Great Wall of Mexico may refer to:
The Great Wall of Mexico (short story), a short story written by John Sladek
A nickname for Tortilla Wall